Honeyburge is a hamlet in the civil parish of Boarstall in Buckinghamshire, England. The hamlet is on Dane's Brook next to Boarstall Wood.

It has nine 9 houses, soon to be 12 (depending on planning permission).

References

Hamlets in Buckinghamshire